Shambuko is a small town in the Gash-Barka Region of Eritrea. The town was overrun by Ethiopia during the Eritrean-Ethiopian War when the population fled from there.

Gash-Barka Region
Populated places in Eritrea